Takesure Chinyama  (born 30 September 1982) is a Zimbabwean former professional footballer who played as a forward.

Club career
Chinyama was born in Harare.

In autumn 2006, he was on trial in Legia Warszawa, but they decided not to buy him. After it, he joined Dyskobolia Grodzisk Wielkopolski. In the summer 2007 he joined again Legia Warszawa, joining up with fellow Zimbabwean national Dickson Choto. He became the first non-European joint top scorer in the Ekstraklasa history. Takesure Chinyama joined Legia Warsaw where there were already his two fellow countrymen: Herbert Dick and Dickson Choto.

After four years, due to his poor performance in the 2009–10 and 2010–11 seasons and recurring health problems, he was released from Legia Warszawa in June 2011.

After a short-term spell at his country's club Dynamos Harare, Chinyama joined South African team Orlando Pirates in July 2012.

Career statistics

References

External links
 
 
 

1982 births
Living people
Sportspeople from Harare
Zimbabwean footballers
Association football forwards
Zimbabwe international footballers
Hwange Colliery F.C. players
Monomotapa United F.C. players
Dyskobolia Grodzisk Wielkopolski players
Legia Warsaw players
Dynamos F.C. players
Orlando Pirates F.C. players
Platinum Stars F.C. players
LZS Piotrówka players
Ekstraklasa players
Zimbabwean expatriate footballers
Zimbabwean expatriate sportspeople in Poland
Expatriate footballers in Poland
Zimbabwean expatriate sportspeople in South Africa
Expatriate soccer players in South Africa